This list of largest reptiles takes into consideration both body length and mass of large reptile species, including average ranges and maximum records. It is worth mentioning that unlike the upper weight of mammals, birds or fish, mass in reptiles is frequently poorly documented, thus subject to conjecture and estimation.

The following table below lists the 15 largest extant reptile species ranked according to their average mass range, with maximum reported/reliable/estimated mass also being provided.

Overall League

Lizards and snakes (Squamata) 

 The most massive living member of this highly diverse reptilian order is the green anaconda (Eunectes murinus) of the neotropical riverways. Rumors of larger anacondas also persist. The fossil of the largest snake ever, the extinct boa Titanoboa were found in coal mines in Colombia.

It is also the largest elapid.

The Eastern diamondback rattlesnake is nearly as large, with the maximum length being  and maximum weight being .

The prehistoric Australian megalania (Varanus priscus), which may have existed up to 40,000 years ago, is the largest terrestrial lizard known to exist, but the lack of a complete skeleton has resulted in a wide range of size estimates.

They are the largest lizards after some large species of monitor lizards, and the largest lizards in the New World. Iguanas vary considerably in size and form, but even the smallest lizards in this family are still quite large. However, the heaviest species in this family is the blue iguana (Cyclura lewisi), with a total length of up to 1.5 m (4.91 ft), a SVL of 51–76 cm (30 in) and a mass of up to  It is the eighth-heaviest and largest extant lizard. It is the second-heaviest iguanid after the blue iguana and the ninth-heaviest and largest lizard in the world. The marine iguana (Amblyrhynchus cristatus) is also among the largest iguanas in the world, and the largest reptile on Galapagos Islands after the Galapagos land iguana, not including turtles reaching a maximum total length of 1.4 m (4.59 ft), a SVL of from 12 till 56 cm (from 4.72 till 22 in)  and a mass of from  depending on islands.
 The largest extant gecko is the New Caledonian giant gecko (Rhacodactylus leachianus) of New Caledonia, which can grow to 14 inches in length.

Tuataras (Sphenodontia) 
The larger of the two extant species of the New Zealand native tuataras is the Brothers Island tuatara (Sphenodon guntheri).

Ichthyosaurs (Ichthyosauria) 

Some of these marine reptiles were comparable in size to modern cetaceans. This massive animal, from the Norian stage in what is now British Columbia, is considered the largest marine reptile so far found in the fossil record. Shonisaurus popularis is another enormous ichthyosaur.

Pantestudines

Turtles and tortoises (Testudines) 

The second-largest extant testudine is the Loggerhead sea turtle. It tends to weight slightly more average weight than the green sea turtle, and reaches more massive top sizes. Other species of Sea turtles are small-medium in size, but are still considered as large-sized for a typical turtle.

The Yangtze giant softshell turtle (Rafetus swinhoei), a critically endangered species of softshell turtle, is sometimes considered as the largest extant freshwater turtle. The heaviest recorded specimen was reported to weigh . Some researchers have claimed that a related species, the Asian giant softshell turtle (Pelochelys cantorii), is the largest living species of freshwater turtle. However, such claims are fraught with problems, because it now seems likely that this species is actually a composite, i.e., consisting of several separate, presently undifferentiated species that have all been traditionally but erroneously lumped together taxonomically as a single species. In the genus chitra, two species of critically endangered turtles have been reported to grow to massive sizes.

 The Galápagos tortoise (Chelonoidis nigra) and the Aldabra giant tortoise (Aldabrachelys gigantea) are considered the largest truly terrestrial reptiles alive today. The African spurred tortoise (Centrochelys sulcata) is the third-largest extant tortoise (and the largest mainland tortoise) in the world.

The largest of side-necked turtles (Pleurodira) is the Arrau turtle (Podocnemis expansa).

There are many extinct turtles that vie for the title of the largest ever.

Meiolaniformes 

Plesiosaurs (Plesiosauria) 

Plesiosaurs were aquatic reptiles of the Mesozoic era. They had a broad flat body, a short tail, and strong flippers. Most of the Plesiosauroidea group are identified by their long necks, while Pliosauroidea are usually short-necked.

Crocodilians (Crocodilia) 

One of the largest known Saltwater crocodile measured  and was shot in Papua New Guinea. Due to the difficulty of trapping and measuring a large living crocodile, the accuracy of these dimensions is yet to be verified. These observations and estimations have been made by park officials over the course of ten years, from 2006 to 2016, however, regardless of the skill of the observers it cannot be compared to a verified tape measurement, especially considering the uncertainty inherent in visual size estimation in the wild. The American crocodile is also one of the largest crocodile species, with large males in the southern part of their range reported to approach  in size.

The False gharial is also a large crocodilian with males reaching  in length, weighing up to at least . The largest gavialid to ever exist was the extinct Rhamphosuchus from the Miocene of Asia. Based on its fossils, the latter species was less massive and heavy than the other giant crocodilians, weighing an estimated .

The largest member of the family Alligatoridae is the Black caiman (Melanosuchus niger) with the American alligator (Alligator mississippiensis) sometimes growing to similar lengths.
 

Pterosaurs (Pterosauria) 

A Mesozoic reptile is believed to have been the largest flying animal that ever existed: the pterosaur Quetzalcoatlus northropi, from North America during the late Cretaceous. Another possible contender for the largest pterosaur is Hatzegopteryx, which is estimated to have had an  wingspan.

Non-avian dinosaurs (Dinosauria) 

 The main contender for the longest sauropod and the longest known vertebrate is Maraapunisaurus fragillimus. Breviparopus taghbaloutensis was mentioned in The Guinness Book of Records as the longest dinosaur at  but this animal is known only from fossil tracks.

References

Notes

Lists of reptiles
Reptiles